Strand is a neighborhood and statistical area (grunnkrets) in Sandefjord municipality, Norway.

The statistical area Strand, which also can include the peripheral parts of the village as well as the surrounding countryside, has a population of 164.

Strand is located in the middle part of Østerøya peninsula. It is considered a part of the urban settlement Sandefjord, which covers the greater Sandefjord city area and stretches towards Stokke and into peripheral parts of Larvik municipality. The urban settlement Sandefjord has a population of 39,849, of which 39,144 people live within Sandefjord.

References

Villages in Vestfold og Telemark